Platten may refer to:

People
 Fritz Platten  (1883–1942), Swiss communist
 John Platten (born 1963), Australian rules footballer
 Rachel Platten (born 1981),  American singer and songwriter
 Stephen George Platten (born 1947), Bishop of Wakefield (Church of England)

Other uses
 Platten, Germany, a municipality in Rhineland-Palatinate, Germany
 An alternate spelling of platen, a platform with a variety of roles in printing or manufacturing

See also
 Lake Platten-See or Lake Balaton, a freshwater lake in the Transdanubian region of Hungary
 Platen (disambiguation)